Stem Cell Theranostics is a privately held biotech company based out of Redwood City, California that provides drug companies with a method to more accurately predict cardiotoxicity and cardiovascular drug efficacy.

History
Stem Cell Theranostics was one of the first med tech startup to come out of the StartX incubator program. The company uses technology developed at Stanford, to create a "clinical trial in a dish" drug screening platform, which reduces the risk of drug development. The company currently works with drug discovery and biotechnology companies to use patient-specific induced pluripotent stem cells for development of novel therapeutics.

References

External links

Companies based in Redwood City, California
Biotechnology companies established in 2011
Technology companies based in the San Francisco Bay Area
2011 establishments in California